Calabria is a region located in Italy. It may also refer to:

Ann Marie Calabria, an American jurist on the North Carolina Court of Appeals
Dante Calabria, an American former professional basketball player and coach
Davide Calabria, an Italian professional footballer
Battle of Calabria,  a naval battle between Italy and Britain during World War II
31 Infantry Division Calabria, an Italian infantry division of World War II
"Calabria" (song), several versions of a house track originally by Danish producer Rune/Enur
"Destination Calabria", a mashup by Italian producer Alex Gaudino, based, in part, on the Rune track
Calabria, ancient name of the Italian region now known as Salento

See also
Calabrian (disambiguation)